This article lists the squads of the men's field hockey competition at the 2022 Commonwealth Games, which will be held in Birmingham, England from 29 July to 8 August 2022.

Pool A

Australia
The squad was announced on 21 June 2022.

Head coach: Colin Batch

New Zealand
Head coach:  Greg Nicol

Pakistan
Head coach:  Siegfried Aikman

Scotland
Head coach: Derek Forsyth

South Africa
The squad was announced on 4 July 2022.

Head coach: Garreth Ewing

Pool B

Canada
The squad was announced on 4 July 2022.

Head coach: Peter Milkovich

England
Head coach: Paul Revington

Ghana
Head coach: Ghazanfar Ali

India
Head coach:  Graham Reid

Wales
Head coach: Daniel Newcombe

References

External links
Official Website

squads